Sadat is a name given to descendants of the Islamic prophet, Muhammad.

Sadat may also refer to:

Places 
 Sadat City, a city in the Monufia Governorate, Egypt
 Sadat, Uttar Pradesh, a town and nagar panchayat in Ghazipur district, India
 Sadat Colony, a block in Gulberg town, Karachi, Pakistan
 Pak Sadat Colony, a neighbourhood in Korangi District, Karachi, Pakistan
 Sadat, Iran (disambiguation)

Other uses 
 Sadat, plural of Sayyid, a title of descendants of Muhammad
 Sadat (miniseries), a 1983 American biographical film about Anwar Sadat
 Sadat Academy for Management Sciences, a public academy in Maadi, Egypt
 Sadat Initiative, a 1977 visit to Israel by Anwar Sadat
 SADAT International Defense Consultancy, a Turkish security contractor
 Sadat Museum, a cultural museum in Alexandria, Egypt, dedicated to Anwar Sadat

See also 

 
 Saadat (disambiguation)